Taylor Hendricks (born November 22, 2003) is an American college basketball player for the UCF Knights of the American Athletic Conference (AAC). He was a three-time Florida High School Athletic Association (FHSSA) champion.

Early life and high school career
Hendricks grew up in Fort Lauderdale, Florida and initially attended NSU University School. The 2018–19  University team with, which included Vernon Carey Jr., Scottie Barnes, Jace and Jett Howard, successfully defended its FHSSA Class 5A State championship with a victory over Andrew Jackson High School, despite Carey being sidelined for the championship game. He transferred to Calvary Christian Academy after his sophomore year. Hendricks averaged 14.1 points, 9.1 rebounds, and 2.1 blocks per game during his junior season while Calvary Christian won the Florida 3A state championship. As a senior, he was named the Broward County Player of the Year after averaging 15.1 points and 8.2 rebounds per game as Calvary Christian repeated as state champions. Hendricks was rated a four-star recruit and committed to play college basketball at Central Florida (UCF) over offers from Florida, Florida State, Miami, LSU, and Iowa State. His commitment made him the highest-ranked recruit in UCF history.

College career
Hendricks entered his freshman season at UCF as the Knights' starting power forward. On November 8, 2022, he opened the season with a 23-point, 2-steal and 3-block effort against UNC Asheville. He was named the American Athletic Conference (AAC) Rookie of the Week for a conference record four consecutive weeks (November 21 through December 12). The only other player to win the American Athletic Conference Rookie of the Week award three weeks in a row was Austin Nichols.  When Hendricks won his sixth American Athletic Conference Rookie of the Week on January 16, 2023, he tied Jalen Duren, Precious Achiuwa and Dedric Lawson for the conference single-season record. On February 6, Jarace Walker won his sixth AAC Rookie of the Week award, tying the group. Hendricks won for a seventh (February 13), eighth (February 27), and ninth time (March 6) to move ahead of the pack and up his career-high to 25 points on February 26 against the Tulsa Golden Hurricane. Hendricks was named to the All-AAC 2nd team and the All-Freshman team.

References

External links
UCF Knights bio
stats at ESPN

2003 births
Living people
American men's basketball players
Basketball players from Florida
NSU University School alumni
Power forwards (basketball)
UCF Knights men's basketball players